Mackenson Cadet (born January 20, 2000) is a Turks and Caicos Islands international footballer. He is currently studying at the Hardin–Simmons University

Career

International
Cadet made his senior international debut on 22 March 2018 in a 4-0 friendly defeat to the Dominican Republic.

Career statistics

International

References

External links
 Mackenson Cadet at Caribbean Football Database
 Mackenson Cadet at ASA College

2000 births
Living people
Association football midfielders
Turks and Caicos Islands footballers
Turks and Caicos Islands expatriate footballers
Turks and Caicos Islands international footballers
Expatriate soccer players in the United States
Turks and Caicos Islands expatriate sportspeople in the United States
Turks and Caicos Islands youth international footballers
ASA Miami Silver Storm men's soccer players
Hardin–Simmons Cowboys men's soccer players
Beach soccer players
AFC Academy players